

552001–552100 

|-bgcolor=#f2f2f2
| colspan=4 align=center | 
|}

552101–552200 

|-bgcolor=#f2f2f2
| colspan=4 align=center | 
|}

552201–552300 

|-bgcolor=#f2f2f2
| colspan=4 align=center | 
|}

552301–552400 

|-bgcolor=#f2f2f2
| colspan=4 align=center | 
|}

552401–552500 

|-bgcolor=#f2f2f2
| colspan=4 align=center | 
|}

552501–552600 

|-bgcolor=#f2f2f2
| colspan=4 align=center | 
|}

552601–552700 

|-bgcolor=#f2f2f2
| colspan=4 align=center | 
|}

552701–552800 

|-id=746
| 552746 Annanobili ||  || Anna Maria Nobili (born 1949) is an Italian physicist at the University of Pisa. Her research includes the dynamics of the Solar System and space physics. || 
|}

552801–552900 

|-id=888
| 552888 Felixrodriguez ||  || Félix Rodríguez de la Fuente (1928–1980) was a Spanish naturalist and pioneer of environmental awareness in Spain, who made TV documentaries for RTVE such as the series El hombre y la Tierra (Man and the Earth). || 
|}

552901–553000 

|-bgcolor=#f2f2f2
| colspan=4 align=center | 
|}

References 

552001-553000